Rhinelander v. Rhinelander was a divorce case between Kip Rhinelander and Alice Jones. Leonard "Kip" Rhinelander (May 9, 1903 – February 20, 1936) was an American socialite and a member of the socially prominent and wealthy New York City Rhinelander family. His marriage at the age of 21 to Alice Jones, a biracial woman who was a working-class daughter of English immigrants, made national headlines in 1924.

Their 1925 divorce trial highlighted contemporary strains related to the instability of the upper class, as well as racial anxiety about "passing" at a time when New York was a destination for numerous blacks from the South in the Great Migration and immigrants from Southern and Eastern Europe. The trial also touched on the vague legal definition of the time as to who was to be considered "white" or "colored," alternately portraying race as biologically determined and knowable or as more fluid.

Interracial marriages in New York State were legal, but rare.

Rhinelander family
Rhinelander was born in 1903 in Pelham, New York to Adelaide Brady (née Kip) and Philip Jacob Rhinelander. Nicknamed “Kip” (his mother's maiden name), Rhinelander was the youngest of five children, including four sons and one daughter. The couple's eldest child, Isaac Leonard Kip, died in infancy. Rhinelander's mother Adelaide died on September 11, 1915 after sustaining burns when an alcohol lamp on her dressing table exploded. The third son, T.J. Oakley Rhinelander, died in France in 1918 while serving in the 107th Regiment during World War I. 

The immigrant ancestor of the Rhinelander family in America was Philip Jacob Rhinelander, a German-born French Huguenot who immigrated to North America in 1686 to escape religious persecution following the revocation of the Edict of Nantes. He settled in the newly formed French Huguenot community of New Rochelle in 1686, where he amassed considerable property holdings, the basis for the family's wealth. The Rhinelanders are considered one of the nation's earliest shipbuilders. The family also had holdings in real estate and owned the Rhinelander Real Estate Company. By the late 19th century, many members of the family were active in philanthropic causes and were active in New York high society.

Marriage
In September 1921, Rhinelander began a romance with Alice Beatrice Jones (July 19, 1899/1900 – September 13, 1989), the daughter of a working-class family. The two met while Rhinelander was attending the Orchard School in Stamford, Connecticut, an inpatient clinic where he was seeking treatment to help him overcome extreme shyness and to cure his stuttering. 
Jones was a few years older than Rhinelander and  the daughter of English immigrants; her mother was white and her father was of mixed race (then termed “mulatto”). It was reported that, during their three-year relationship, Jones’ father, George, attempted to dissuade the couple from continuing their romance. George Jones reportedly tried appealing to Rhinelander that his family would never accept his daughter due to their differences in class. However, Alice Jones would eventually file court papers, denying that her father ever made this attempt. In February 1922, Rhinelander's father, Philip, attempted to end the relationship by sending his son away to Bermuda on a chaperoned excursion that would separate the couple for two years, as he traveled to Washington D.C., Havana, Panama and California. In October 1922, Philip Rhinelander placed his son in an Arizona private school. However, the couple kept in contact through letters, as evidenced by letters produced at the trial, and when Leonard Rhinelander turned 21 years old, he returned to New York. On October 14, 1924, he married Jones in a civil ceremony at New Rochelle's city hall. The marriage certificate listed both the groom and the bride as "white." Once Jones' ethnicity came into question, the fact that her marriage license identified her as "white" was reported, implying that she had sought to hide her mixed racial ancestry. During the trial, Jones' attorney asked Leonard Rhinelander whether the city hall clerk who had filled out their marriage license had asked either of them whether they were white or "colored." Rhinelander said the clerk had not. 

The newlyweds rented an apartment in New Rochelle, ordered furniture and moved in with Jones' parents in Pelham Manor while setting up their household. Rhinelander did not tell his family of the marriage, but continued to stay in Manhattan and work at Rhinelander Real Estate Company during the week.

Although the couple attempted to keep their marriage secret—Jones' sister Grace claimed the couple even paid reporters not to announce their marriage—the press soon announced the news of the marriage. Because of the Rhinelanders' fortune and social standing, New Rochelle reporters were eager to learn about Jones' background and began investigating. Reporters discovered that Jones was the daughter of English immigrants and her father, George, was a "colored man." The Rhinelanders got wind that reporters had discovered Jones' heritage and attempted to keep the information out of the papers. According to one article printed in the New York Daily Mirror, the Rhinelanders sent an "agent" to warn the editor of the New Rochelle Standard Star that if the story was printed, there would be "dire punishment." The editor ignored the threat and on November 13, 1924, the New Rochelle Standard Star printed the story with the headline, "Rhinelander's Son Marries Daughter of Colored Man."

The New York Evening Post picked up the story but was hesitant to identify Jones' father as black. They instead referred to George Jones as being "West Indian." Other papers picked up the story but most were also careful to omit the racial angle, choosing instead of focus on the differences in Rhinelander and Jones’ social class.  In a number of newspapers, Jones was variously identified as a nanny, a nurse or a laundress. 
Other media accounts referred to the jobs of Jones’ family; her father was identified as a cab driver or stagecoach driver and her uncle as a butler, which at the time were understood to be positions held mainly by black people . The Hearst-owned tabloid New York Daily Mirror, however, ran a front-page banner headline: "RHINELANDER WEDS NEGRESS/Society dumbfounded."  And the black newspaper The Pittsburgh Courier referred to both parties' races, with the front-page headline "Caucasian '400' Stunned Over Marriage of White Millionaire to Colored Beauty." Most larger city papers were wary of printing such a scandalous story, deferential to or fearful of the Rhinelanders' wealth and prominent social status.

Divorce trial
For a time, Rhinelander stood by his wife during the intense national coverage of their marriage. But after two weeks under a threat of disinheritance, he succumbed to his family's demands that he leave Jones and signed an annulment complaint that his father's lawyers had prepared. The document asserted that Jones had intentionally deceived Rhinelander by hiding her true race and had passed as a white woman. Jones' attorney denied Rhinelander's claim on her behalf, saying that her mixed race was obvious. Rhinelander later said that Jones hadn't deceived him outright but did so by letting him believe she was white. 

The ensuing divorce trial in New Rochelle was known as Rhinelander v. Rhinelander and attracted national attention. Rhinelander's attorney was Isaac N. Mills, a former New York Supreme Court justice. Jones retained a former protégé of Mills, Lee Parsons Davis. The jury was all-white and all-male. Jones' attorney Davis said openly that his client and Rhinelander had engaged in sex before they were married; he read love letters written by Rhinelander that detailed the couple's intimate sexual activity. Davis contended that Rhinelander had seen Jones' "dusky" breasts and legs, thus making it impossible for him not to have known that Jones was biracial. He also showed that Rhinelander had clearly pursued her, overturning Mills' presentation of Rhinelander as having been bewitched by an older woman.  In an unusual turn, blackface performer Al Jolson was called to testify that he did not have an affair with Jones, after a letter was disclosed at the trial in which she said she heard from a co-worker that Jolson was a "flirt." "It was a year-long event marked by several bizarre developments, including rumors of bribery and extortion, public reading of Leonard's love-letters, the partial disrobing of the defendant so that the jurors could examine her skin."

The trial was notorious for Jones being asked to display a portion of her body to the jury in the judge's chambers. Wearing a coat over underwear, she dropped the coat to the top of her breasts so they could see her shoulders; then she pulled it up so they could see her lower legs. The question of "whiteness" was not litigated, but this was Davis' attempt to show what Rhinelander would have seen. (245 N.Y. 510). The jury viewed her shoulders, back and legs, concluding that she was indeed "colored" and that Rhinelander had to have been aware that she had some black ancestry, and thus could be reasonably sure that she had not tried to deceive him about her racial identity. The judge barred reporters from seeing the demonstration to prevent any photographs. The tabloid newspaper New York Evening Graphic, which had regularly used composographs to depict various events, usually salacious in nature, created a photograph depicting a model stripped to the waist with her back to the camera being viewed by a group of lawyers and one woman in a courtroom. The photo ran on the front page of the Evening Graphic and boosted the paper's circulation.

After weighing all the evidence, the jury ruled in Jones' favor. The annulment Rhinelander requested was denied and the marriage was upheld. "Alice's court victory may have been enabled by the fact that Alice performed her racial identity as the all-white, male, married jurors expected of a colored woman, and that Leonard failed to perform his racial, gender, and class identities as expected of him as a white, wealthy gentleman."

Rhinelander appealed several times but the verdict was upheld. He disappeared from public view but was discovered living in Nevada in July 1929. Rhinelander was using the assumed name "Lou Russell," had grown a mustache, put on weight and was working as a woodcutter. Jones remained in New York where she filed a separation suit against Rhinelander, charging him with abandonment and his father with interference with the marriage. In December 1929, Rhinelander was granted a divorce by default in Las Vegas. The divorce was not recognized in New York, where Jones still had a separation suit pending.

Rhinelander and Jones eventually reached a settlement in the separation suit. Rhinelander was ordered to pay Jones a lump sum of $32,500 (approximately $) and $3,600 a year for the remainder of her life—$300 a month, which was never adjusted for inflation. In return, Jones forfeited all claims to the Rhinelander estate and agreed not to use the Rhinelander name or to speak publicly or write about her story. She honored those terms for the rest of her life.

Later years
Rhinelander eventually returned to New York where he worked as an auditor for his family's company, the Rhinelander Real Estate Company. Rhinelander never remarried.

On February 20, 1936, at the age of 32, Rhinelander died of lobar pneumonia at his father's home in Long Beach, New York. He was buried in the family vault in Woodlawn Cemetery in The Bronx.

After Rhinelander's death, his father, Philip, followed the advice of the family attorney and continued to pay Jones her yearly settlement money.  However, when Phillip died four years later in March 1940, at age 74, leaving his multimillion-dollar estate to his lone surviving child, Adelaide, as well as two nieces, and two granddaughters, Adelaide promptly stopped the quarterly payments. The disbursements accounted for only 0.0004 of the estate, but the heirs opposed them as "an onerous demand for life support." Jones took Phillip Rhinelander's heirs to court. After two years of court battles, the New York Supreme Court upheld the original settlement agreement, and the heirs resumed Jones' payments.

After her final court battle with the Rhinelanders, Alice Jones remained out of the public eye. She also never remarried; she continued to live with her parents in Pelham Manor. Her father died of a heart attack in 1933. Her mother died of a stroke in December 1938.

Alice Jones died in a Westchester hospital on September 13, 1989, of a heart attack caused by a stroke and hypertension. Her bank account contained $25,000 and she owned a one-third interest in her family home on Pelham Road, worth about $70,000. Her death certificate indicated that she had spent nearly a year in hospitalization. It showed her name as "Alice Jones," but when she was buried in Beechwoods Cemetery in New Rochelle, it was with a gravestone that bore the name "Alice J. Rhinelander."

The Rhinelander Case in the Arts 
The case's depiction of interracial marriage influenced some of the literature and art of this period. The writer Nella Larsen, in her famous novel Passing, tells the story of Clare Kendry, a biracial woman who passes as caucasian and marries a white man. She passes in order to get away from her past troubles in terms of race and class, both of which arise in the Rhinelander case. In the novel, Clare marries John Bellew, a wealthy white man, who is not aware of her true racial identity. The literature as well as the Rhinelander case explore the complexity of racial identity in a public institution such as marriage. The Rhinelander Case also appears in Oscar Micheaux's films, “The House Behind the Cedars” and “Thirty Years Later.”  The case also served as the basis for the movie Night of the Quarter Moon (1959), starring Julie London and John Drew Barrymore.

Case citation
Leonard Rhinelander v. Alice Rhinelander; 219 A.D. 189; 219 N.Y.S. 548; Supreme Court of New York, Appellate Division, Second Department (1927).

Footnotes

References

  
 
Carlson, A. Cheree. (1999) "'You Know It When You See It:' The Rhetorical Hierarchy of Race and Gender in Rhinelander V. Rhinelander." Quarterly Journal of Speech 85 (1999): 111–128, .

External links
Composograph of Alice Rhinelander, 1925, American Photography, PBS
Nov. 17, 1925 Ltr from Andrew F. Jackson, manager of Cinema News Service, to the manager (probably William M. Smith, manager of the Douglass Theatre) advertising newsreels, including one from the Rhinelander v. Rhinelander trial, Selections from the Records of Macon's Douglass Theatre, The Blues, Black Vaudeville, and the Silver Screen, 1912-1930s, Digital Library of Georgia 
Heidi Ardizzone and Earl Lewis, "Love and Race Caught in the Public Eye", Notre Dame News, 31 May 2001
"Till Divorce Do Us", American Heritage, July 2000
Excerpt from Mark Kittrell, Review: Earl Lewis and Heidi Ardizzone, Love on Trial: an American Scandal in Black and White, 4 Journal of Law and Family Studies], University of Dayton

Burials at Woodlawn Cemetery (Bronx, New York)
Deaths from pneumonia in New York (state)
People from Pelham, New York
Race-related controversies in the United States